John Allen (June 12, 1763 – July 31, 1812) was an eighteenth-century lawyer and politician. He served as a United States representative from Connecticut and as a member of the Connecticut Supreme Court of Errors.

Early life and career
Allen was born in Great Barrington in the Province of Massachusetts Bay. He attended the common schools and taught school in Germantown, Pennsylvania and New Milford, Connecticut, before studying law at the Litchfield Law School from 1784 to 1786. Allen was admitted to the bar in 1786 and began the practice of law in Litchfield, Connecticut.

Allen began his political career as a member of the Connecticut House of Representatives, serving in the State House from 1793 to 1796. He served as clerk of the State House in 1796. He was elected as a Federalist candidate to the Fifth Congress, serving from March 4, 1797 to March 3, 1799. He was a proponent of the Alien and Sedition Acts. He declined to be a candidate for renomination in 1798.

He was a member of the State council and of the Supreme Court of Errors from 1800 to 1806. He continued the practice of law in Litchfield until his death in 1812. Allen is interred in East Cemetery in Litchfield.

Personal life
Allen married Ursula McCurdy, a graduate of the Litchfield Female Academy. They had two children, John W. Allen and Ursula Allen. Their son John W. Allen was a U.S. Representative from Ohio from March 4, 1837 to March 3, 1841.

Allen's sister, Annie Willard Allen Goodrich, was married to Elizur Goodrich, a U.S. Representative from Connecticut, serving from March 4, 1799 to March 3, 1801.

References

External links 
 Biographical Directory of the United States Congress: ALLEN, John, (1763 - 1812)
 
 The Political Graveyard: Allen, John (1763–1812)
 Strangers to Us All: John Allen

1763 births
1812 deaths
People from Great Barrington, Massachusetts
People of colonial Massachusetts
American people of English descent
Federalist Party members of the United States House of Representatives from Connecticut
Members of the Connecticut House of Representatives
Members of the Connecticut General Assembly Council of Assistants (1662–1818)
Connecticut state court judges
Litchfield Law School alumni